Keith Barrington Cassells (born 10 July 1957) is an English retired professional football forward, best remembered for his four seasons in the Football League with Mansfield Town. He also played league football for Watford, Oxford United, Brentford and briefly in the First Division for Southampton. He acquired the nickname "Rosie" during his playing career.

Career

Early years 
A forward, Cassells began his career at Isthmian League club Wembley, before joining Fourth Division club Watford for a £500 fee in October 1977. A double promotion from the Fourth to the Second Division hampered Cassells' chances at Vicarage Road and he made just 17 appearances before his departure in November 1980.

Oxford United and Southampton 
In November 1980, Cassells dropped back down to the Third Division to join Oxford United as the makeweight in the deal which saw Les Taylor join Watford for a £100,000 fee. He scored 25 goals in 60 matches, before making a surprise move to First Division club Southampton for an £80,000 fee in March 1982. At the end of the 1981–82 season, he was named in the Third Division PFA Team of the Year. Cassells failed to make a breakthrough at The Dell and made just 27 appearances and scored five goals before leaving the club in February 1983.

Brentford 
Cassells dropped back down to the Third Division to join Brentford for a £25,000 fee in February 1983. Signed as a replacement for the injured Tony Mahoney, over the following  seasons he proved himself to be "a powerful-running frontman" and "a consistent, if unspectacular goalscorer". A switch to the right wing during the 1984–85 season saw Cassells finish the season as the team's leading league goalscorer (12) and the team's joint-leading goalscorer (18, with Gary Roberts). He also helped the team to the 1985 Football League Trophy Final and the match proved to be his final Brentford appearance. After rejecting a new contract, Cassells departed Griffin Park in August 1985 and finished his Bees career with 102 appearances and 28 goals.

Mansfield Town 
Cassells joined Fourth Division club Mansfield Town for a £17,000 fee in August 1985. He had an excellent 1985–86 season, scoring a hat-trick on his debut and helping the club secure promotion to the Third Division with a third-place finish. He experienced more success in the following season, winning the 1987 Football League Trophy Final, despite missing a penalty in the deciding shootout. His career was ended by injury in 1989, by which time he had made 163 league appearances and scored 52 goals for the Stags.

Personal life
Before becoming a professional footballer, Cassells worked as a postman. After his retirement from football in 1989, he joined the Hertfordshire Constabulary and rose to the rank of detective sergeant. He was awarded the Police Long Service and Good Conduct Medal in 2011.

Honours 

Mansfield Town
 Football League Fourth Division third-place promotion: 1985–86
 Football League Trophy: 1986–87

Individual

 Football League Third Division PFA Team of the Year: 1981–82

Career statistics

References

1957 births
Footballers from Islington (district)
Living people
Watford F.C. players
Peterborough United F.C. players
Oxford United F.C. players
Southampton F.C. players
Brentford F.C. players
Mansfield Town F.C. players
English footballers
Wembley F.C. players
English Football League players
Isthmian League players
British police officers
Association football forwards